The Mosaic Project is an album by jazz drummer Terri Lyne Carrington released in 2011 on Concord Jazz Records. The album reached No. 2 on the Billboard Contemporary Jazz Albums chart and No. 4 on the Billboard Top Jazz Albums chart.

Overview
The album is part jazz, part rhythm and blues (R&B), with vocals contributed by Cassandra Wilson, Dianne Reeves, Dee Dee Bridgewater, Gretchen Parlato, Esperanza Spalding, and Nona Hendryx.

Carrington wrote five of the songs, including "Magic and Music", a tribute to singer Teena Marie, who died in 2010 seven months before The Mosaic Project was released.

Covers
Lyne Carrington covered Ethel Merman's "I Got Lost in His Arms", "Michelle" by the Beatles and 
"Simply Beautiful" by Al Green on the album.

Critical reception

Jeff Tamarkin of Jazz Times proclaimed that "Carrington’s percussion and kit playing is potent throughout" on an LP where "seemingly unrelated elements coalesce into a greater, cohesive whole".
Lara Bellini of the BBC noted that the album "steers clear of easy compartmentalization with its openness and freedom" and "offers, simply, some of the best jazz around."
Nick Coleman of The Independent also described The Mosaic Project as "accessible, song-based contemporary jazz at its most earnest, ordered and empowering".

The Mosaic Project also won a Grammy Award for Best Vocal Jazz Album.

Track listing

Personnel
 Terri Lyne Carrington – drums, percussion, arranger, producer
 Cassandra Wilson – vocals
 Dianne Reeves – vocals
 Dee Dee Bridgewater – vocals
 Gretchen Parlato – vocals
 Carmen Lundy – vocals
 Nona Hendryx – vocals
 Shea Rose – vocals
 Esperanza Spalding – vocals, bass
 Mimi Jones – bass
 Anat Cohen – clarinet, bass clarinet, soprano saxophone
 Tineke Postma – alto saxophone, soprano saxophone
 Patrice Rushen – keyboards, piano
 Geri Allen – keyboards, piano
 Helen Sung – keyboards, piano
 Ingrid Jensen – flugelhorn, trumpet
 Hailey Niswanger – flute
 Linda Taylor – guitar
 Chia-Yin Carol Ma – violin
 Sheila E. – percussion
 Angela Davis – commentary

Technical
 Robert Hebert – executive producer
 Frank White – executive producer
 Bernie Yaged – associate producer
 Martin Walters – mixing
 Mike Marciano – engineer
 Erik Zobler – engineer
 Chaye DeGasperin – engineer
 Jeremy Loucas – engineer, mixing
 wiidope – Remix engineer, mixing
 Paul Blakemore – mastering

References

2011 albums
Concord Records albums
Grammy Award for Best Jazz Vocal Album
Terri Lyne Carrington albums